The Christian has been the title of several magazines:

 The Christian magazine: or, Evangelical repository (fl. 1798)
 The Christian (1802–1822), a publication of the Associate Reformed Presbyterian Church
 The Christian (1824–1827), of the Mendon Association of Congregational Ministers.
 The Christian (1840s–1974), a magazine of the Christian Church (Disciples of Christ). It was renamed The Disciple following a merger with the church's mission magazine World Call in 1974. The merged magazine started out as a bi-weekly, then became a monthly.

References

Christian magazines